BC Goverla is a professional basketball club based in Ivano-Frankivsk, Ukraine. The team plays in the Higher League, the Ukrainian second division. The team colours are green and yellow.

History
The club was founded in August 2002. Goverla entered the Ukrainian Basketball SuperLeague, the highest tier of professional basketball in Ukraine, in 2009.

Honours
Ukrainian Cup
Runners-up (1): 2013

Season by season

Players

Notable players

 Seamus Boxley
 Jeremy Chappell
 Dante Swanson
 Ryan Pearson

References

External links
Official site
Team profile at eurobasket.com

Basketball teams in Ukraine
Sport in Ivano-Frankivsk
Basketball teams established in 2002
2002 establishments in Ukraine